Reyburn is a surname. Notable people with the surname include:

Amedee Reyburn (1879–1920), American freestyle swimmer and water polo player who competed in the 1904 Summer Olympics
John E. Reyburn (1845–1914), Republican member of the U.S. House of Representatives from Pennsylvania
Robert Reyburn (1810–1892), Scottish born New Zealand orchardist, farmer and politician
Wallace Reyburn (1913–2001), New Zealand-born humourist author, rugby writer and creator of urban legends
William S. Reyburn (1882–1946), Republican member of the U.S. House of Representatives from Pennsylvania